Eriopyga crista is a moth of the family Noctuidae found from the southern United States (including Arizona) through Central America to South America and on the  Antilles.

References

Hadeninae
Moths of North America
Moths of the Caribbean
Moths of Central America
Moths of South America
Moths of Cuba
Insects of the Dominican Republic
Lepidoptera of Brazil
Lepidoptera of Jamaica
Insects of Puerto Rico
Moths described in 1856